Total Drama Presents: The Ridonculous Race (also known as Total Drama: Ridonculous Race or simply The Ridonculous Race) is a Canadian animated reality television series which lampoons the conventions commonly found in reality television (specifically The Amazing Race). The show is a spin-off of the original Total Drama series created in 2007 and the second series created as part of the overall franchise. The series is created by Fresh TV Inc. and distributed by Cake Entertainment. The series premiered in the United States on Cartoon Network on September 7, 2015, while in Canada, the series premiered on the Canadian version of Cartoon Network on January 4, 2016. It also aired on ABC3 in Australia, starting December 12, 2015, and CBBC (via BBC iPlayer) in the United Kingdom. The series consists of 26 episodes.

Plot
Racers, divided into teams of two, visit a different country or location in every episode and perform in "legs". Teams must race to the "Chill Zone", the finish line for each leg taking on the form of a gold "Carpet of Completion". The first team to arrive there have the advantage of starting early, while the team finishing last may face elimination. In each of the 26 episodes, each team is required to press a button on any "Don-box" they meet to receive clues that let them decide which challenge they will have to complete.

Each challenge contains a task that teams must complete to advance throughout the leg. Challenges come in four different types: "All-In", which has both members of each team complete a task together; "Botch-or-Watch", which requires one member of each team, usually the team member who did not take on a prior challenge's component, to perform a task; "Either-or", in which teams are given a choice between two different tasks that have to be completed in the same manner as an "All-In"; and "Superteam", in which multiple teams complete together as a team to finish a task.

Characters and cast
Total Drama Presents: The Ridonculous Race has 36 brand new contestants with 18 teams, along with four contestants from the original Total Drama series. The contestants compete in teams of two throughout the season. 

Characters in bold are reused characters from the original series, while the rest are brand new characters. However, some voice actors and actresses who previously worked on Total Drama returned to voice new characters. In addition, Anne Maria, Blaineley, Chris McLean, and Ezekiel (pictured in a wanted poster) all made non-speaking cameo appearances in the season finale.

Elimination table

This table summarizes the order which teams rank overall throughout the series; teams are listed in reverse order of elimination.

Key

Each column shows the results of the leg of the race from that episode of the series.

A  team placement means the team was eliminated.
A  team placement means the team withdrew from the race.
An  team's placement indicates that the team came in last on a non-elimination leg.
Matching coloured symbols ( and ) indicate teams who worked together during the leg as a result of a Superteam twist.

Notes

 Noah & Owen initially arrived 11th, but were issued a 20-minute penalty for failing to ride their cheese wheel down the river and roll it to the Chill Zone as instructed, since Owen had consumed the whole cheese. Five teams checked in during their penalty time, dropping them to 16th.
 Dwayne & Junior initially arrived 1st, but were issued a 20-minute penalty as Dwayne read the Travel-Tip before reuniting with Junior during the Botch-or-Watch. Three teams (excluding Tom & Jen) checked in during their penalty time, dropping them to 4th.
 Tom & Jen initially arrived 2nd, but were issued a 20-minute penalty for arriving in Calanque de Maubois by yacht instead of train as instructed. Two teams checked in during their penalty time, dropping them to 5th (after Dwayne & Junior).
 Kelly & Taylor initially arrived 7th, but were issued a one-hour penalty as Taylor did not follow Kelly back through the geyser field after incorrectly repeating the Icelandic phrase during the All-In, when she was instructed to do so. Six teams checked in during their penalty time, dropping them to 13th.
 Laurie & Miles initially arrived 1st, but were issued a 30-minute penalty as Miles made both components of the Brazilian carnival costume during the All-In, when she and Laurie were instructed to make one each. All other teams checked in during their penalty time, dropping them to last and resulting in their elimination.
 Crimson & Ennui initially arrived 6th, but were issued a 10-minute penalty for switching positions during the All-In. Six teams checked in during their penalty time, dropping them to 12th.
 Leg 14 was a double-elimination leg, where the last two teams to reach the Chill Zone were eliminated.
 Jacques & Josee initially arrived 1st, but were issued a 10-minute penalty as they arrived at the Chill Zone on foot, when they were instructed to ride burros there. MacArthur & Sanders checked in during this time, dropping them to 2nd.
 Jacques & Josee initially arrived 1st, but were issued a 30-minute penalty for failing to collect a ball from the bottom of the borehole as instructed, since they had instead stolen the ball from Emma & Kitty while suspended on the way down. This did not affect their placement.
 Jacques & Josee initially arrived 1st, but were issued a one-hour penalty for disconnecting the trailing carriages of the train that transported them to the Chill Zone. Three teams checked in during this time, dropping them to 4th.
 In Leg 24, Carrie & Devin checked in the Chill Zone in 3rd place and were declared safe. While they celebrated, trailing team Emma & Kitty accidentally knocked Devin off the cliff where the Chill Zone was located after losing control of their emu from the Botch-or-Watch. Carrie & Devin were forced to withdraw from the race due to Devin's injuries and had to choose a previously eliminated team to replace them. Brody & Geoff were chosen to return to the race.
 Jacques & Josee were last to arrive at the mid-point Chill Zone in Central Park and were eliminated in the middle part of the Final Leg.
 The Final Leg has two endings, depending on the location of the audience. Brody & Geoff are the winners in Australia, Brazil, Bulgaria, Denmark, France, Israel, Latin America, Netherlands, Norway, Poland, Portugal, Russia and the USA [Cartoon Network]. They are also the winners in the United Kingdom [BBC iPlayer]. MacArthur & Sanders are the winners in Canada, Croatia, Hungary, Italy, Portugal, Romania, United Kingdom and the USA (Netflix)

Production
Production commenced on January 1, 2014 and concluded on October 30, 2015. It was announced that Alex Ganetakos was producing the show, Terry McGurrin was writing the screenplay, and that Chad Hicks was directing. The new host Don was revealed in a Fresh TV post in October 2014. It was confirmed that 26 episodes would be picked up for the show and that it would air sometime the same year. However, one of the producers, Alex Ganetakos, stated that many Ridonculous Race seasons are possible if the first season is successful. In June 2015, the entire first episode was leaked online, revealing all of the characters three months before Fresh TV could release their designs in their website.

Casting
Even though some of the characters from the main series do make appearances, the spin-off series has predominantly a new cast. In fact, there are only four characters returning from the original series, while the rest are brand new characters. Kristin Fairlie, the voice actor for the character Bridgette from the original series, was cast to voice one of the new contestants, Carrie. Scott McCord (voice of characters Owen and Trent in the original series) as well as Carter Hayden (voice of Noah in the original) were also revealed to be returning to the cast, and were seen in the recording studio together. It was later confirmed that the actors were indeed going to voice the characters Owen and Noah. It was eventually revealed that the first pair is to be the aforementioned character Carrie and her best friend Devin, who is played by Jeff Geddis. In February, the second pair was revealed: Stephanie and Ryan. The two are voiced by Nicki Burke of Dead Rising 2 and Joseph Motiki, from Rescue Heroes. In a new promotion by Cake Entertainment, Geoff was also revealed to be among the returning cast, teamed up with Brody, one of his friends from home. The father-son team of Dwayne and Dwayne Jr. was also revealed.

In June, a pair of goths called Ennui and Crimson, and Mary and Ellody, two close friends who are dubbed the "Geniuses", were revealed with news that returning voice actors Carter Hayden and Emilie-Claire Barlow (voice of Courtney) from the original series would play them. A week later, the fourth pair to be released are Emma and Kitty, who are Asian sisters with opposite personalities, referred to as the "Sisters". A week later, another team was confirmed; Chet and Lorenzo, known as "the Stepbrothers". Next to be revealed are twins Mickey and Jay, called "the Adversity Twins", who are plagued with countless phobias, allergies, injuries, disorders, immunities, and ailments. The rest of the teams were all revealed shortly thereafter.

Episodes

Media
A video game has been released that allows players to choose any of the series' 36 main characters and race them in short endless running games. The game, titled "Donculous Dash", was released on January 4, 2016, in Canada only. The game can be downloaded from the Canadian app store and a demo version is also available on their Cartoon Network website.

Availability
The Ridonculous Race is seldom released on any home media, not even Region 4 DVD nor digital download. The only availability of the spinoff is the entirety of the series released as one video on YouTube, as well as the episodic structure on Netflix, but erroneously as season 7 of Total Drama. In the United Kingdom, the season is available on BBC iPlayer as of April 4, 2022. The Ridonculous Race remains the only show in the franchise to be available on BBC iPlayer to this date.

See also
Total Drama World Tour, the third season of the original series by the same producers.
The Amazing Race, the reality series that The Ridonculous Race primarily parodies. 
The Amazing Race Canada, the Canadian edition of The Amazing Race.
In Real Life, a similar reality series that was also produced in Canada.

References

External links

Total Drama
2010s Canadian animated television series
2010s Canadian comedy-drama television series
2010s Canadian reality television series
2010s Canadian satirical television series
2015 Canadian television series debuts
2015 Canadian television series endings
Canadian animated television spin-offs
Canadian adult animated comedy television series
Canadian children's animated comedy television series
Canadian adult animated drama television series
Canadian children's animated drama television series
Canadian children's reality television series
Canadian flash animated television series
English-language television shows
Reality television series franchises
Reality television spin-offs
Teen animated television series
Teletoon original programming
Television series by Fresh TV
Television shows filmed in Toronto